Francisco Antúnez Espada (1 November 1922 – 16 August 1994) was a footballer. He took part in the 1950 FIFA World Cup. He won the Spanish League in 1946 with Sevilla FC, the only one in its history.

External links

National team data 

 

 

1922 births
1994 deaths
Footballers from Seville
Spanish footballers
Association football defenders
La Liga players
Real Betis players
Sevilla FC players
Málaga CF players
Xerez CD footballers
Spain international footballers
1950 FIFA World Cup players
Spanish football managers
Recreativo de Huelva managers
Granada CF managers
Real Oviedo managers
Sevilla Atlético managers